Recuerdos del Alma (Eng.: Soul Memories) is the title of a studio album released by romantic music group Los Temerarios. This album became their seventh number-one set on the Billboard Top Latin Albums.

Track listing
The information from Billboard.

Personnel
This information from Allmusic.
Adolfo Ángel Alba — Producer
Ernesto Abrego — Keyboards, musical direction
Mayra Angelica Alba — Production coordination
Guadalupe Alfaro — Vihuela
Martin Arano — Percussion
Onesimo Arce — Guitar
Jose Luis Ayala — Drums
Lorenzo González de Gortari — Concert comedian
César Gómez — Flute
Bruce Weeden — Mastering, mixing
Eric Mora — Acoustic guitar
David Jiménez López — Assistant engineer
Gabriel Martínez — Engineer
Clay Perry — Pro Tools
Adriana Rebold — Graphic design
Adolfo Pérez Butrón — Photography
Steve Boxall — Photo assistance

Chart performance

Sales and certifications

References

2007 albums
Los Temerarios albums
Spanish-language albums
Fonovisa Records albums